Christian Heinrich "Henry" Thane (February 10, 1850-July 4, 1938) was a wealthy businessman and bank owner in Arkansas. His Craftsman-style home, Thane House, was designed by Little Rock architect Charles L. Thompson. It is listed on the National Register of Historic Places.

Thane was born in Germany and raised in Metropolis, Illinois. An important figure in the development of Arkansas City, he held various political offices, including mayor. He worked as a lawyer for the Little Rock, Pine Bluff & New Orleans Railroad, owned a lumber mill, and a bank.

Thane was elected to the Arkansas Senate and served representing the 15th District (Desha and Chicot counties) in the 24th Arkansas General Assembly and the 25th Arkansas General Assembly.

Thame's photograph is included in a composite of 1885 Arkansas State Senate members.

References

Year of birth missing
Arkansas state senators
People from Desha County, Arkansas
People from Chicot County, Arkansas
Mayors of places in Arkansas